Wang Lizhuo (born 18 April 1998) is a Chinese swimmer. He competed in the men's 100 metre breaststroke at the 2019 World Aquatics Championships.

References

External links
 

1998 births
Living people
Place of birth missing (living people)
Chinese male breaststroke swimmers